Alberto Torelli (born 11 May 1995) is an Italian football player. He plays for Italian Eccellenza club Atletico Gallo.

Club career
He made his Serie C debut for Santarcangelo on 30 August 2014 in a game against Lucchese.

On 25 September 2018, Torelli signed for Giulianova.

References

External links
 
 
 Alberto Torelli at TuttoCampo

1995 births
People from Pesaro
Living people
Italian footballers
Vis Pesaro dal 1898 players
A.C. Carpi players
Santarcangelo Calcio players
A.C.N. Siena 1904 players
Carrarese Calcio players
Alma Juventus Fano 1906 players
A.S.D. Città di Giulianova 1924 players
S.E.F. Torres 1903 players
F.C. Lumezzane V.G.Z. A.S.D. players
Serie B players
Serie C players
Serie D players
Eccellenza players
Association football midfielders
Sportspeople from the Province of Pesaro and Urbino
Footballers from Marche